Major Wilhelm Trapp, nicknamed Papa Trapp by his subordinates, (Nitzow, 4 September 1889 – executed 18 December 1948, Siedlce) was a career policeman who commanded the Reserve Police Battalion 101 formation of Nazi Germany uniformed police force known as Order Police (Ordnungspolizei).

A World War I veteran, recipient of the Iron Cross First Class, and an "old Party fighter", having joined the NSDAP in December 1932, Trapp served in occupied Poland during World War II, subsequently leading his battalion of nearly 500 middle-aged men from Hamburg on genocidal missions against the Polish Jews.

He was captured after the war by the Allies and handed over to the British authorities. After investigation by the Polish Military Mission he was extradited to Poland in 1946, and charged with war crimes and crimes against humanity. Trapp was found guilty and sentenced to death by the Siedlce District Court on 6 July 1948, and executed on 18 December 1948.

Excerpts

The killing of 1,500 of the 1,800 Jews from Józefów (other names: Józefów Biłgorajski, Józefów Ordynacki, Józefów Roztoczański) located twenty miles southeast of Biłgoraj in Distrikt Lublin on 13 July 1942  was performed by German (Ordnungspolizei) policemen: the 1. Company, and, mostly, by the three platoons of the 2. Company. Trapp gave his commanders their respective assignments before the operation:

The bodies of the dead carpeting the forest floor at the Winiarczykowa Góra hill (about 2 km from the village) were left unburied. Watches, jewelry and money were taken.

The Reserve Police Battalion 101 left for Biłgoraj at 9 pm. According to one policeman, Trapp told him "Man, … such jobs don't suit me. But orders are orders." Trapp later remarked to his driver: "If this Jewish business is ever avenged on earth, then have mercy on us Germans."

Notes

References
  See also Penguin Books edition.
 

1889 births
1948 deaths
Nazi Party members
Nazis executed by Poland by hanging
Holocaust perpetrators in Poland
Executed mass murderers
Reserve Police Battalion 101